Bald and Bankrupt is an English travel vlog YouTube channel operated by Benjamin Rich (born 1 July 1974), Rich is better known as Mr. Bald on his YouTube channel. As of December 2022, the channel had 3.7 million subscribers and 539 million views.

Career
The defining characteristic of Rich's channel is his interest in the post-Soviet states. However, he first started vlogging from India after filing for bankruptcy in the UK due to a failed business venture, which (alongside his shaved head) inspired the name of his channel. Ever since he ventured into Eastern Europe, the attention to his videos has increased. 

On 12 April 2018, under the pen name Arthur Chichester, Rich released the book The Burning Edge: Travelling Through Irradiated Belarus about his experiences travelling through the parts of Belarus affected by the Chernobyl disaster.

Rich's video about a trip to Patamanta in Bolivia was reported by Gizmodo Español as "more scary than entering Chernobyl". In the video, he informed a local woman that he was a tourist, prompting her to warn him that "they burn people" in the area. Two men later approached Rich, inspected his passport, and gave him 30 minutes to explore and leave the area.

Following a November 2019 video filmed on a train to Chechnya, Rich was forced to apologize on camera by Chechen authorities for referring to a Chechen woman as a "chick", which the Chechen authorities claimed was disparaging.

In May 2020, after exploring no-lockdown areas during the COVID-19 pandemic in Serbia, Rich disappeared for two months. He later revealed that he had caught COVID-19, and that he could not walk to the bathroom or breathe by the time he sought medical attention. He learned that he had low blood oxygen and was suffering from multiple organ failure before spending a week in an intensive care unit. After uploading a video about his illness, treatment, and recovery, he urged fans not to make the same mistakes and to take the virus seriously.

On 7 May 2022, Rich was allegedly arrested for unsanctioned entry to a guarded site, an administrative offence that was punished with a fine of up to 5,000 roubles. Rich denied the reports and stated he was fined by Russian police after being questioned for a few hours for going to see the Buran spaceplane without permission.

On 1 September 2022, Rich posted a vlog to his Bald and Bankrupt YouTube channel announcing he had been arrested and subsequently ordered to leave Russia; he announced that it would be his final video covering travels through Russia, as he had been banned from returning. He previously called Vladimir Putin "crazy" and posted a link to fundraise for Ukraine.

Reception 
Rich's content has attracted coverage in various national media, particularly publications in the towns and regions he visits. New Delhi publication The New Learn reported on Rich's travels in India in January 2019. They praised his visits to refugee camps for Hindus in North Delhi stranded after the crisis in Pakistan, describing his videos as "introducing the world to an India that is real and authentic, where people still open up their lunch boxes to strangers, where tea is the beginning of lifelong associations, where trust means more than money and where there is vibrancy everywhere".

In March 2019, Hindustan Times reported on how he exposed scams against tourists in Delhi Airport, from inflated prices to rickshaw drivers and false claims. In June 2019, Rich was discussed in the Slovak press for his visit to Luník IX, which he described as "Europe's largest poor Roma neighbourhood". The article described how, despite warnings about the estate being among the most dangerous in Europe, he was welcomed by local people who spoke fluent English and invited him to their homes, which he described as "better than [his] apartment in Britain". Swedish YouTube personality PewDiePie stated in a July 2019 episode of the YouTube podcast series Cold Ones that Bald and Bankrupt is his favourite YouTube channel.

Afisha Daily journalist Lyubava Zaitseva wrote about Rich's choice of Russian destinations in September 2019, stating that even its Russian readers had "not seen such Russia" and praising him for "trying to distance himself from tourist places" and showing cities "from the inside, communicating with local residents".

Publications

References

External links 

 Bald's main channel
 Bald's second channel

1974 births
Living people
English YouTubers
British travel writers
YouTube travel vloggers
Russophilia
21st-century English people
20th-century English people